Emma Kunz (1892–1963) was a Swiss healer, researcher, and artist. She published three books and produced many drawings.

Early life 
Emma Kunz was born to a family of weavers in 1892 in Brittnau, Switzerland.

Career 
Kunz was not a trained artist; she is characterized as an outsider artist. Inspired by spiritual evolution, she divined with a pendulum and created her drawings by radiesthesia. Kunz did not intend for her works to be seen in a fine arts context; none of her works were titled or dated. Kunz instead recorded the medical meanings of her works in books.

Kunz began creating large-scale drawings on graph paper with pencil, colored pencil and oil pastels starting in 1938. She considered her drawings to be holograms that could be experienced multidimensionally.

In 1942 in Würenlos, Kunz discovered "AION A," a healing rock. The rock is still mined from the same place, and is sold in Switzerland.

At the time of her death, Kunz had left behind a substantial body of work of 400 drawings. Kunz's first exhibition in the early 1970s, posthumously.

The UK's Serpentine Gallery presented Kunz's second solo exhibition in 2019; the exhibition marked Kunz's first solo showing in the United Kingdom. For the exhibition, artist Christodoulos Panayiotou produced stone benches quarried from AION A.

Legacy 

Said one scholar, in comparing her to other women artists, "Hilma af Klint, Agnes Martin, and Emma Kunz approached geometric abstraction not as formalism, but as a means of structuring philosophical, scientific, and spiritual ideas. Using line, geometry, and the grid, each of these artists created diagrammatic drawings of their exploration of complex belief systems and restorative practices."

The Emma Kunz Centre was founded in 1986 by Anton C. Meier, a relative of Kunz's, to preserve Kunz's research findings and art. The Emma Kunz Museum opened in 1991.

Exhibitions
Der Fall von Emma Kunz (The Case of Emma Kunz), 1973
3 x Abstraction: New Methods of Drawing by Hilma af Klint, Emma Kunz, and Agnes Martin, Santa Monica Museum of Art (2005). .
55th Venice Biennale, 'The Encyclopedic Palace' Central Pavilion curated by Massimiliano Gioni
Emma Kunz: Visionary Drawings, Serpentine Galleries, 2019
Emma Kunz Cosmos - A Visionary in Dialogue with Contemporary Art, Aargauer Kunsthaus, 2021

Publications
Leben (Life) (1930) - Poetry by Emma Kunz
The Miracle of Creative Revelation (1953, self-published) - by Emma Kunz
New Methods of Drawing (1953, self-published) - by Emma Kunz
Emma Kunz (1976) - by Heini & Harald Szeemann & Thomas Ring. Widmer
Emma Kunz 1892-1963. Forscherin, Naturheilpraktikerin, Künstlerin (1994) - by Anton C. Meier
Emma Kunz. Artist, Researcher, Healer (1998)
3 x An Abstraction: New Methods of Drawing by Hilma Af Klint, Emma Kunz and Agnes Martin (2005) - by Catherine De Zegher
World Receivers: Georgiana Houghton - Hilma af Klint - Emma Kunz (2019)
Zahl, Rhythmus, Wandlung : Emma Kunz und Gegenwartskunst (2020) - by Régine Bonnefoit
Emma Kunz A Visionary in Dialogue With Contemporary Art (2021) - Edited by Yasmin Afschar

References

External links
Master of the Month: Emma Kunz, Juxtapoz Magazine
Emma Kunz Stiftung (Emma Kunz Foundation)

1892 births
1963 deaths
Women outsider artists
Outsider artists
Swiss women artists
Swiss artists
Drawing mediums
20th-century American women artists
20th-century American people